" I'm Not Alright" is a song by Canadian duo Loud Luxury and American rapper and singer Bryce Vine. It was released on July 12, 2019 from Bryce Vine's album Carnival.

Background
“I’m Not Alright” is the brainchild of Loud Luxury’s chance encounter with Bryce Vine in Los Angeles.  Loud Luxury said: “We met Vine at a party…through a friend when we got back from our fall tour,” “The next day, he came over and showed us an idea he had that was just a guitar and chorus. During our winter tour we worked across North America in hotel rooms, studios, and even an Uber with our headphones to finish writing the song.”

Music video
The music video was released on October 15, 2019, directed by Miles & AJ and filmed in Los Angeles. Filled with liquor, good looking guests and epic beats, shooting the visual, and Vine said: “The Loud Luxury boys have become some of my favorite people to hang with and it all started with this song,” he says. “We shot the entire video in one night and didn’t finish until 5am, but it never felt like work.”

Live performance
On September 26, 2019, Loud Luxury and Vine performed the song on The Late Late Show.

Charts

Weekly charts

Year-end charts

Certifications

References

2019 songs
2019 singles
Loud Luxury songs
Bryce Vine songs